Donaldson is an unincorporated community in Hampshire County in the U.S. state of West Virginia. It is located in Green Spring Valley on Green Spring Road (West Virginia Secondary Route 1) between Green Spring and Springfield. Donaldson was once a thriving railroad community along the South Branch Valley Railroad with its own school and post office   in operation.

References

External links 

Unincorporated communities in Hampshire County, West Virginia
Unincorporated communities in West Virginia